There are two species of eel named sharpnose sand eel:
 Apterichtus flavicaudus
 Ichthyapus acuticeps